Edith Eva Eger (born September 29, 1927) is a Slovakian-born American psychologist. Born to Hungarian Jewish parents, she is a Holocaust survivor and a specialist in the treatment of post-traumatic stress disorder. Her memoirs entitled The Choice - Embrace the Possible, published in 2017, became an international bestseller. Her second book, titled The Gift - 12 Lessons to Save Your Life was published in September 2020.

Biography 
Edith Eger is the youngest daughter of Lajos and Ilona Elefánt, Hungarian Jews in an area which was, at the time of her birth, in Czechoslovakia. Her father was a tailor.

Eger's hometown, Košice, belonged to Hungary before June 1920 and after 1938 and was called Kassa during that time. Eger attended gymnasium high school and took ballet lessons. She was a member of the Hungarian Olympic gymnastics team. In 1942 the Hungarian government enacted new anti-Jewish laws and she was removed from the gymnastics team. Her elder sister Klara was a violin player and was admitted to the Conservatory of Budapest. During the war Klara was hidden by her music teacher. Her sister Magda was a pianist.

In March 1944, after the German occupation of Hungary, Eger was forced to live in the Kassa ghetto with her parents and Magda. In April they were forced to stay in a brick factory with 12,000 other Jews for a month. In May of that year they were deported to Auschwitz. When she was selected for the gas chamber, she was separated from her mother by Josef Mengele. Her mother was murdered in the gas chamber. In her memoirs, Eger relates that the same evening Mengele made her dance for him in her barracks. As a "thank you", she received a loaf of bread that she shared with other girls.

According to her memoirs, Eger stayed in various camps, including Mauthausen. The Nazis evacuated Mauthausen and other concentration camps as the Americans and Russians approached. Eger was sent on a death march with her sister Magda to the Gunskirchen concentration camp, a distance of about 55 kilometers. When she couldn't walk further due to exhaustion, one of the girls with whom she had shared Mengele's bread recognized her and carried her onward together with Magda. Conditions in Gunskirchen were so bad that Eger had to eat grass to survive, while other prisoners turned to cannibalism. When the U.S. military liberated the camp in May 1945, according to Eger, she was left for dead among a number of dead bodies. A soldier is said to have rescued her after seeing her hand move. The soldier quickly sought medical attention and saved her life. She weighed 32 kilograms (5 stone / 70 pounds) at the time, and had a broken back, typhoid fever, pneumonia, and pleurisy.

After the war 
Edith and Magda recovered in American field hospitals and returned to Kassa where they found their sister Clara. Their parents and Edith's fiancé Eric did not survive Auschwitz. She married Béla (Albert) Éger, whom she met in the hospital. He was also a Jewish survivor who had joined the partisans during the war. In 1949, after threats from the communists, they fled together with their daughter to the United States. There she suffered from her war trauma and survivor guilt, and did not want to talk about the war with her three children.

Eger befriended Viktor Frankl, went into therapy, and received her PhD in Clinical Psychology from the University of Texas at El Paso in 1978. She also received her license to practise as a psychologist. She opened a therapy clinic in La Jolla, California and was appointed to the faculty at the University of California, San Diego.

In 1990, Eger returned to Auschwitz to face her repressed emotions. At the urging of Philip Zimbardo, she published her experiences in her first book  in 2017.

In her work as a psychologist, Eger helps her clients to free themselves from their own thoughts, and helps them to ultimately choose freedom. The Choice became a New York Times and Sunday Times bestseller. In her second book The Gift (2020) she encourages the reader to change the thoughts that, according to Eger, imprison us and the destructive behaviors that would hinder us. What happens to us in life is not the most important thing in the end, she says. Rather, the most important thing is what we do with our lives.

Eger has appeared on CNN and the Oprah Winfrey Show.

Family 
The Eger family had two more children after moving to the United States. Their daughter Marianne is married to Robert Engle, Nobel laureate in economics. Béla Eger died in 1993.

Publications 
 The Choice - Embrace the Possible. Scribner, 2017, 
 The Gift - 12 Lessons to Save Your Life. Ebury Publishing, 2020,

References

1927 births
Living people
American women psychologists
21st-century American psychologists
Auschwitz concentration camp survivors
Hungarian emigrants to the United States
21st-century American women writers
21st-century American memoirists
Mauthausen concentration camp survivors
20th-century American psychologists